In folklore, a crone is an old woman who may be characterized as disagreeable, malicious, or sinister in manner, often with magical or supernatural associations that can make her either helpful or obstructive. The Crone is also an archetypal figure, a Wise Woman. As a character type, the crone shares characteristics with the hag. The word became further specialized as the third aspect of the Triple Goddess popularized by Robert Graves and subsequently in some forms of neopaganism, particularly Wicca in which she symbolizes the Dark Goddess, the dark of the moon, the end of a cycle; together with the Mother and the Maiden she represents part of the circle of life. In New Age and feminist spiritual circles, a "Croning" is a ritual rite of passage into an era of wisdom, freedom, and personal power.

According to scholar Clarissa Pinkola Estés, the Crone is "the one who sees far, who looks into the spaces between the worlds and can literally see what is coming, what has been, and what is now and what underlies and stands behind many things. [...] The Crone represents the ability to see, more than just with one’s eyes alone, but to see with the heart’s eyes, with the soul’s eyes, through the eyes of the creative force and the animating force of the psyche."

Etymology
As a noun, crone entered the English language around the year 1390, deriving from the Anglo-French word carogne (an insult), itself deriving from the Old North French charogne, caroigne, meaning a disagreeable woman (literally meaning "carrion"). Prior to the entrance of the word into English, the surname Hopcrone is recorded (around 1323–1324).

Clarissa Pinkola Estes suggests that the word crone may derive from the word crown (or, la corona). While a crown is known as a circlet that goes around the head and establishes one’s authority as a leader, "before this understanding, the crown, la corona, was understood to mean the halo of light around a person’s body. La corona was considered to shine more brightly when a person was clear, filled with love and justice." Thus, Estes suggests, the Crone is one who reflects this enhanced degree of clarity and in/sight.

Examples
In Norse myth, Thor wrestles the crone Elli who personifies old age.

The Slavic witch Baba Yaga is a crone and liminal guardian to the Otherworld.

In the local folklore of Somerset in southwest England, the Woman of the Mist is said to appear sometimes as a crone gathering sticks; sightings of her were reported as late as the 1950s. In the Scottish Highlands tale "The Poor Brother and the Rich", a crone refuses to stay buried, until her son-in-law provides a generous wake, after which he becomes as wealthy as his more fortunate brother.

In Cuban traditional folklore  old women often appear as helpful characters, as in the tale of the sick man who cannot get well until he meets an old woman who advises him to wear the tunic of a man who is truly happy. According to writer Alma Flor Ada, "They tend to be the ones who keep the family together, who pass on the traditions, who know the remedies that would cure the different illnesses".

See also 

Black Annis
Fairy godmother
Hag
La Befana
Queen (Snow White)
The Witch (fairy tale)
Wicca
Wicked fairy godmother
Witchcraft

References

Wicca
Fairy tale stock characters
Folklore characters
European folklore characters
Stereotypes of women
Slang terms for women
Female legendary creatures
Female characters in fairy tales
Pejorative terms for women
Gender-related stereotypes
Terms for women
Fictional witches
New Age